Kou Tie (born April 1950) is a Chinese major general in the People's Liberation Army. As of November 2014 he was under investigation by the  military authorities. In May 2015 the Communist government turn his case over to military prosecutors. Previously he served as commander of Heilongjiang Military District.

Kou Tie was a delegate to the 11th National People's Congress. He is a member of the China Calligraphers Association. He was a lyricist of the Army Song of the 23rd Army.

Biography
Kou Tie was born in Anda, Heilongjiang, in April 1950. He graduated from PLA National Defence University. He enlisted in the People's Liberation Army in March 1968 by age 18, during the dawn of Cultural Revolution. He was successively as soldier, platoon leader, section chief, and division commander before serving as chief of staff of the 40th Army in December 1996. He was promoted to major general in July 1998. He was deputy army commander of the 40th Army in December 2001, and held that office until January 2002, when he was promoted to become commander of the 23rd Army. He was the 14th and the last army commander of the 23rd Army, due to the Army was revoked in November 2003. Then he was transferred to another post as commander of Heilongjiang Military District, serving in the post until he retirement in September 2010. He has come under investigation for "serious legal violations" in November 2004 and was transferred to the military judicial organ in May 2015.

References

External links

1950 births
People from Suihua
Living people
PLA National Defence University alumni
People's Liberation Army generals from Heilongjiang